This is a list of the top 20 songs of 2010 in Mexico according to Monitor Latino. Monitor Latino also issued separate year-end charts for Regional Mexican, Pop and Anglo songs.

See also
List of number-one songs of 2010 (Mexico)
List of number-one albums of 2010 (Mexico)

References

2010 in Mexican music
Mexico
Mexican record charts